The Ministry of Dairy Development is a Ministry of the Government of Maharashtra 
state. 

The Ministry is headed by a cabinet level Minister. Radhakrishna Vikhe Patil 
is Current Minister of Dairy Development Government of Maharashtra.

Head office

List of Cabinet Ministers

List of Ministers of State

References 

Government of Maharashtra
Government ministries of Maharashtra
Maharashtra